Jay N. Shih or Shih Ning-jye is a Taiwanese politician. He has been the Minister of the Directorate-General of Personnel Administration since 20 May 2016. He was the Minister of the Research, Development and Evaluation Commission of the Executive Yuan from 2006 to 2008.

Education
Shih obtained his bachelor's degree in political science from National Taiwan University in 1983, master's degrees in public administration from National Chengchi University and Syracuse University in the United States in 1985 and 1987, respectively, and doctoral degree in public and international affairs from the University of Pittsburgh in the United States in 1991.

References

Political office-holders in the Republic of China on Taiwan
Living people
1960 births